Pukotala is a settlement in Ha'ano island, Tonga. It has a population of 89.

References

Populated places in Tonga
Haʻapai